Aruna Sundararajan is India's Telecom Secretary and Chairman of the Telecom Commission. A 1982 batch IAS officer from Kerala Cadre, Ms Sundararajan, is one of the most senior civil servants of the Indian Administrative Service (IAS) in the country. Ms Sundararajan has over three decades of experience in a variety of leadership roles in the Central and State Governments, especially in Economic and Development Administration, Investment Promotion and IT/Telecom Domains.

Career 
Ms. Sundararajan was instrumental in establishing the IT department of Kerala way back in 1998. As Kerala's founding IT Secretary, she had conceived and spearheaded the Akshaya project, first started in the rural district of Malappuram, Kerala, India, and subsequently extended to the entire state. Akshaya was the largest e-literacy project of its kind where over 1 million people were trained in basic digital skills on a campaign mode. Akshaya also catalysed one of the largest known Internet Protocol (IP) based rural wireless networks in the world. Akshaya has received domestic and international acclaim as one of the most pioneering and digitally transformation projects globally.
Ms. Sundararajan was also instrumental in establishing the IIITMK, and the InfoPark, Kochi, which changed the IT landscape of the state of Kerala and in initiating the SMART City project, Kochi. She had held many important positions including the Country Head of the Global E schools Initiative of the UN and CEO of the prestigious Common Service Centre Project under the National E-Governance Project, of the Government of India.

Awards and honours 
Ms.Sundararajan was honoured as one of the top professional women achievers by India Today in 2009 and by Forbes Business Magazine in Aug 2012. She was also honored with the USIBC Transformative Leadership Award 2017 for distinguished public service and her commitment to advancing U.S.-India cooperation and Digital India, constituted by the US-India Business Council.

References 

People from Kerala
Indian government officials
Year of birth missing (living people)
Living people
Indian Administrative Service officers from Kerala
Civil Servants from Kerala